The Bureau Of Public Enterprises (BPE) serves as the secretariat of the National Council on Privatisation (NCP) and is charged with the overall responsibility of implementing the council's policies on privatisation and commercialisation.

Functions
 Implementation of the NCP policies on privatisation and commercialisation.
 Preparation of public enterprises approved by the NCP for privatisation and commercialisation.
 Advising the NCP on further public enterprises which may be privatised or commercialised
 Advising the NCP on the capital restructuring needs of Nigerian public enterprises to be privatised
 Account management for all commercialised enterprises for financial discipline
 Vetting candidates for appointments as: Consultants, advisers, investment bankers, issuing houses stockbrokers, Solicitors, trustees, accountants and other professionals required for the purpose of either privatisation or commercialisation
 Management of post transactional performance monitoring and evaluation
 To minimise economic inequalities by promoting public welfare activities.
 to promote balanced regional development by developing industries in every part of the country.
 To carry out all activities required for the successful issue of shares and sale of assets of the public enterprises to be privatized.
 To advise the NCP on the allotment pattern for the sale of the shares of the public enterprises set out for privatisation.
 To oversee the actual sale of shares of the public enterprises to be privatised, by the issuing houses, in accordance with the guidelines approved, from time to time, by the NCP.
 To ensure the success of the privatisation exercise taking into account the need for balance and meaningful participation by Nigerians and foreigners in accordance with the relevant laws of Nigeria.
 To implement the NCP's policy on commercialisation.
 To prepare public enterprises approved by the NCP for commercialisation.
 To advise the NCP on further public enterprises that may be commercialised.
 To ensure the updating of the accounts of all commercialised enterprises to ensure financial discipline.
 To ensure the success of the commercialisation exercise and monitor, on a continuous basis for such period as may be considered necessary, the operations of the public enterprises after commercialisation.
 To review the objectives for which public enterprises were established in order to ensure that they adapt to the changing needs of the economy.
 To ensure that public enterprises are managed in accordance with sound commercial principles and prudent financial practices.
 To interface with the public enterprises, together with the supervising Ministries, in order to ensure effective monitoring and safeguarding of the public enterprises’ managerial autonomy.
 To ensure that the Board and Management of each commercialised enterprise and the Government of the Federation, keep to the terms and conditions of the Performance Agreements, if any, between the public enterprise concerned and the Government of the Federation.
 To maintain and review on a continuous basis, any Performance Agreement between a public enterprise and the Government of the Federation. 
 To evaluate and recommend to the NCP whether or not a public enterprise is eligible for funding through grants, loans, subventions or equity; and
 To provide secretarial support to the NCP.

References
http://www.bpe.gov.ng/ BPE - Official Website]

Economy of Nigeria

>